The 2020 Little Rock Trojans baseball team represented the University of Arkansas at Little Rock during the 2020 NCAA Division I baseball season. The Trojans played their home games at Gary Hogan Field and were led by sixth year head coach Chris Curry. They were members of the Sun Belt Conference.

Preseason

Signing Day Recruits

Sun Belt Conference Coaches Poll
The Sun Belt Conference Coaches Poll was released on January 30, 2020 and the Trojans were picked to finish fourth in the West Division.

Preseason All-Sun Belt Team & Honors
Drake Nightengale (USA, Sr, Pitcher)
Zach McCambley (CCU, Jr, Pitcher)
Levi Thomas (TROY, Jr, Pitcher)
Andrew Papp (APP, Sr, Pitcher)
Jack Jumper (ARST, Sr, Pitcher)
Kale Emshoff (LR, RS-Jr, Catcher)
Kaleb DeLatorre (USA, Sr, First Base)
Luke Drumheller (APP, So, Second Base)
Hayden Cantrelle (LA, Jr, Shortstop)
Garrett Scott (LR, RS-Sr, Third Base)
Mason McWhorter (GASO, Sr, Outfielder)
Ethan Wilson (USA, So, Outfielder)
Rigsby Mosley (TROY, Jr, Outfielder)
Will Hollis (TXST, Sr, Designated Hitter)
Andrew Beesley (ULM, Sr, Utility)

Roster

Coaching staff

Schedule and results

Schedule Source:
*Rankings are based on the team's current ranking in the D1Baseball poll.

References

Little Rock
Little Rock Trojans baseball seasons
Little Rock Trojans baseball